Michele De Nadai (born 8 September 1954 in Milan) is a retired Italian professional footballer who played as a defender or midfielder. 

He played for five seasons (83 games, 4 goals) in the Italian Serie A for A.C. Milan and A.S. Roma.

He scored a goal in the only game he played for A.C. Milan, a 2–1 win over A.C. Cesena on 2 May 1976.

De Nadai also played for Lazio.

References

1954 births
Living people
Italian footballers
Serie A players
Serie B players
Serie C players
Calcio Lecco 1912 players
A.C. Milan players
A.C. Monza players
A.S. Roma players
S.S. Lazio players
U.S. Pistoiese 1921 players
U.S. Salernitana 1919 players

Association football defenders